The 2010 Abilene Christian Wildcats football team was an American football team that represented Abilene Christian University (ACU) as a member of the Lone Star Conference (LSC) during the 2010 NCAA Division II football season. In their sixth season under head coach Chris Thomsen, the Wildcats compiled an 11–1 record (10–0 against conference opponents). They were selected to the Division II playoffs, where they were defeated by Central Missouri in the second round, 55–41.

The team played its home games at Shotwell Stadium in Abilene, Texas.

Schedule

References

Abilene Christian
Abilene Christian Wildcats football seasons
Lone Star Conference football champion seasons
Abilene Christian Wildcats football